Eugene Carter Massie (May 27, 1861 – April 4, 1924) was an American politician who served in the Virginia House of Delegates.

References

External links 

1861 births
1924 deaths
Members of the Virginia House of Delegates
20th-century American politicians